Robert Daines may refer to:
Robert H. Daines (1905–1985), American academic and Latter-day Saint
Robert H. Daines III (born 1934), American academic and Latter-day Saint
Robert M. Daines, American lawyer and professor of law and business